The Confession Tapes is a true crime television documentary series that presents several cases of possible false confessions leading to murder convictions of the featured people. In each case, the documentary presents alternate views of how the crime could have taken place and features experts on false confessions, criminal law, miscarriages of justice and psychology. The series, produced and distributed by Netflix, became available to all Netflix subscribers on September 8, 2017. Critics praised the series, likening it to other Netflix true crime documentaries, such as The Keepers and Making a Murderer.

Episodes

Series overview

Season 1 (2017)

Season 2 (2019)

Reception
Reception to the series was mostly positive. The Daily Beast called it "harrowing", saying it "further solidifies" Netflix as the "leading purveyor of non-fiction true-crime TV." JOE described the series as "addictive". One of the women featured, Karen Boes, told WCRZ that she was hopeful the documentary would help exonerate her. Scientific American praised the series, saying that it proves that "we need to change the way police do interrogations."

References

External links

2017 American television series debuts
2010s American documentary television series
English-language Netflix original programming
Netflix original documentary television series
Documentary television series about crime in the United States